South-southwest of St. Petersburg, Florida, Fort De Soto Park is a park operated by Pinellas County on five offshore keys, or islands: Madelaine Key, St. Jean Key, St. Christopher Key, Bonne Fortune Key and the main island, Mullet Key. The keys are connected by either bridge or causeway. The island group is accessible by toll road from the mainland. Historically, the islands were used for military fortifications; remnants and a museum exhibit this history. Two piers, beaches, picnic area, hiking trails, bicycling trails, kayak trail, and a ferry to Egmont Key State Park are available.

The park is a gateway site for the Great Florida Birding Trail.

History

Early history
The area of today's Fort De Soto was originally inhabited by the Tocobaga Native Americans from about 1000 to 1500 ACE. They lived on Mullet Key and other barrier islands in the area, eating fish, clams, conch, oysters and whelks from the Gulf of Mexico.  Their diet was supplemented by occasional game food as well as the plants they gathered.

In 1529, the Spanish explorer Pánfilo de Narváez investigated the barrier islands after his expedition landed  between St. Pete Beach and Clearwater, Florida. Ten years later, Hernando De Soto came ashore somewhere near the southern part of Tampa Bay, beginning what would culminate in the conquest of Florida for the Spanish Empire.

Military use
In 1849, a detachment of US Army engineers, including future Confederate General Robert E. Lee surveyed the area. They recommended Mullet and Egmont Keys become fortified as appropriate site for coastal defense installations.  Both keys could only be reached by boat as they were completely separated from the mainland. Although the US Government did not build any fortifications on the two keys, they did station Union Army troops there during the American Civil War.  Their purpose was to aid in the Union naval blockade of Tampa Bay, with the Egmont Key lighthouse acting as an observation tower. 

The keys were not used for military purposes again until 1882, when military reservations were  created on the two keys. However, fortifications were not built on them until the Spanish–American War.

Hillsborough County established a quarantine station on the eastern side of Mullet Key in 1889. It became known as Mullet Key Quarantine Station. The Marine Hospital Service took over jurisdiction of the station in 1901. The duty of the station was to inspect aliens aboard ships arriving from foreign ports. By 1925, the station operated with fifteen buildings. The quarantine station operated until 1937, when the Public Health Service transferred its operations there to Gadsden Point, near Tampa.

The main operation on Mullet Key was named Fort De Soto in 1900, in honor of Hernando de Soto. The Army post was officially a subpost of Fort Dade, which was constructed on Egmont Key. These posts were to contain batteries of artillery and mortars to protect Tampa Bay from any invading forces. Construction of Fort De Soto began in November 1898 and was completed in 1906. The foundation was constructed of a seashell concrete formula, and the walls and ceiling used a seashell, stone, and concrete mix. The fort contained artillery and 12-inch coast defense mortar batteries, Batteries Laidley and Bigelow. The post consisted of 29 buildings. The post's features included a large barracks, a hospital, a guardhouse, a blacksmith and carpenter shop, an administration building, and mess hall with kitchen, a bakery, and a storehouse. The site also had brick roads, concrete sidewalks, and a narrow-gauge railroad to aid in moving materials and supplies around the post.

Fort De Soto was active from 1898 to 1910. At least one company was present at Fort De Soto at all times and many times several units were present. Mosquitoes were a constant problem and the post was very hot in the summers. In 1910, most of the Army troops were moved from Fort De Soto to Fort Morgan, Alabama. Only a caretaker force remained; by 1914, only an ordnance sergeant and game warden remained at the post. Through most of World War I, a larger caretaker force was at the post, usually with about twenty-two privates, two noncommissioned officers, and two commissioned officers. In 1917, four of Fort De Soto's mortars were disassembled and shipped to Fort Rosecrans in San Diego, California.

In November 1922, the Army announced it would inactivate both Forts De Soto and Dade. On 1 July 1924, the Harbor Defenses of Tampa were inactivated, designated as a subordinate installation of the Harbor Defenses of Pensacola, and reduced to caretaker status. By 1926, the forts had been disarmed except for four 12-inch mortars of Battery Laidley at Fort De Soto, which remained under caretaker status. The forts were meant to be reactivated and rearmed in time of war, but that never occurred. From 1929, the 637th Coast Artillery Regiment's mobilization assignment was the Coast Defenses of Tampa, but that unit was never initiated in the Organized Reserve. On 16 November 1935, the Headquarters, Headquarters Battery, and the Medical Department Detachment of the Coast Defenses of Tampa were organized with Regular Army Inactive (Organized Reserve) personnel from the Fourth Corps Area at large. A number of tropical storms and hurricanes severely damaged the buildings on the post. A few were destroyed, as was Battery Bigelow in 1932. The Army attempted to sell the post, but there was little interest. In September 1938, Pinellas County bought the areas on Mullet Key for $12,500.

Conversion to civilian use
Shortly after Pinellas County purchased Mullet Key,, county commissioners granted a lease to Percy L. Roberts for the use of land and buildings on the island the Mullet Key Quarantine Service had once used. The St. Petersburg Times reported the Commission's action in its January 25, 1939, edition:

<blockquote>Lease of Mullet Key buildings to Percy Roberts was ratified Monday by county commissioners who made no change in the tentative lease approved last week.Roberts will pay the county $50 a month for the first year and $100 a month for the next two years for the lease of two buildings on the extreme south end of the county's property on the key.The lessee will operate a daily boat service to the island and will serve fish dinners and rent fishing tackle. The distance from his dock near the Bee Line ferry will be 10 miles. He will land in a sheltered cove on the north end of the island. Trips will be started in about three weeks.<ref>Staff (January 24, 1939) St. Petersburg Times p.7</ref></blockquote>

Roberts, a native of St. Petersburg and local plumbing contractor, had a simple business plan. First, run a passenger boat to Mullet Key facilitating access to the isolated island. This service was expected to attract both fishermen and sightseers. For the fishermen, easy access to the pristine fishing waters of lower Tampa Bay; for the sightseers, easy access to the ruins of historic Fort De Soto and the white-sand beaches facing the Gulf of Mexico. Secondly, establish a hotel and restaurant on the island. Roberts envisioned creating a venue on the island appealing to clubs, associations, and other organizations for group outings of members for fishing, sightseeing, and "dining on fried mullet".

With lease in hand and business plan formulated, and with the financial support of Charles R. Carter, a local insurance executive and president of the Bee Line Ferry Co., Roberts immediately began implementing his plan.

For transportation to the isolated island, the passenger boat Hobo was put into service. Hobo operated daily from the Bee Line Ferry Terminal at St. Petersburg's Pinellas Point, pulling away from the dock early morning and leaving for the return trip late afternoon. Hobo was also available for chartered trips in between scheduled runs. "By boat" was not the only means of transportation to the island. A strip of land on the island was cleared in response to requests by some who wanted to fly small aircraft in and out.

Lodging and eating accommodations on the island were fashioned by renovating a building vacated by the Quarantine Service in 1937. The facility at best was austere, but one who was tired and hungry could get a good night's sleep; plenty of coffee, a hearty serving of bacon and eggs for breakfast; any of an assortment of sandwiches for lunch; and, a family style meal of fried mullet with all the trimmings for supper. A screened-in porch was there for those who just wanted to lean back, prop up the feet, enjoy a cool beverage, and relax. This facility became known familiarly as Mullet Key Lodge.

Rubert "Rube" Allyn, a writer for the St. Petersburg Times, included in his March 28, 1939, column, "Along the Waterfront":

When the Pinellas county commissioners leased the old Fort De Soto, and Mullet Key to Percy Roberts, they did a fine thing for the tourists by opening up the vast uninhabited reaches of Mullet Key and the old fort to exploration parties ... Today for a nominal fee, one can take a boat at Pinellas Point, and go to Mullet Key, land at the old Quarantine dock, enjoy an old-fashioned fish dinner prepared in the same manner as the pioneers of 50 years ago, by the Roberts family, and explore miles of uninhabited beaches, bayous, and the old Spanish–American War fort ...

Bombing range
In less than two years, Mullet Key Lodge became well established and profitable. However, this first for-profit business founded on the island was short-lived. The lease, granted to Roberts in 1939, had to be rescinded because the US War Department decided it wanted the island back for use as a bombing range by the U.S. Army Air Corps in support of air bases then being constructed in the Tampa Bay area. That pending transaction was reported by the St. Petersburg Times'' on December 18, 1940:

Mullet Key purchased by the county from the Treasury department in 1938 for $12,500 will soon be taken over by the United States Army Air Corps for use as a bombing range. The Air Corps will pay the county all that has been expended to date and will pay to Capt. Charles R. Carter all he has expended in improving the building into a fishing lodge. It is understood that Capt. Carter has an investment of about $8,000 while the county’s total investment is about $13,800.In June 1941, the federal government bought back Mullet Key from Pinellas County for $18,404. As planned, It was turned into a sub-post of MacDill Field and used as a bombing range throughout World War II.

County park

After World War II, the by then-renamed U.S. Army Air Forces had no need for Mullet Key, and it was a sold back to Pinellas County along with adjacent islands Sister Key, Hospital Key, Rattlesnake Key, and Scratch Key. The sale, for $26,495.54, was finalized in 1948. County officials immediately designated Fort De Soto and all of Mullet Key a county recreational area and declared it open to the public. Soon thereafter excursion passenger boats began regularly scheduled trips to the island.

In 1962, a toll road, the Pinellas Bayway (formerly State Road A19A, now SR 682), was completed to the mainland, enabling island visitors to arrive by car. On December 21, 1962, Fort De Soto Park opened. On May 11, 1963, Fort De Soto Park was officially dedicated. Its facilities have been expanded over the years. The quartermaster storehouse was reconstructed to become the Quartermaster Storehouse Museum. On December 2, 1977, the Fort De Soto batteries were placed on the National Register of Historic Places. The four 12-inch M1890 mortars and two 6-inch Armstrong guns at Fort De Soto are the only weapons of their type remaining in the United States.

Recreational activities and amenities
The park is open year-round and has the following features:
 Several thousand acres of firm-bottomed shallows, making the area a favored destination of wading anglers
 Two piers, each allowing fishing. Both have bait, tackle and food concessions.
 Various picnic areas.
 Fort De Soto, built in 1898, abandoned in phases 1910 to 1948.
 Quartermaster Storehouse Museum.
 Two swimming areas, North Beach and East Beach. North Beach has been named to "America's Top 10 Beaches" list by Dr. Beach numerous times. In 2005 it moved to the first place in this list, being recognized as America's Best Beach.
 800-foot boat ramp.
 Camping area with a camp store, modern restrooms and laundry room.
 Snack bar with gift shop at the old fort.
 Seven-mile multi-purpose trail.
 2¼ mile canoe trail.
 Barrier-free nature trail.
 Paw Playground, an area to exercise pets.
 Ferry to Egmont Key, site of Egmont Key State Park.

Ecology 
Fort De Soto Park is a hub for biodiversity, featuring various ecosystems such as mangroves and hammocks. Over 328 species of birds have been documented at the park, with large areas of the North Beach protected for both the nesting of breeding birds, and the stopover of migratory birds. However, due to factors such as habitat loss and increased abundance of the brown-headed cowbird (a brood parasite), species such as the mangrove cuckoo, black-whiskered vireo, and prairie warbler no longer breed in this location.

As with many beach habitats in the region, also breeding in this park are endangered loggerhead sea turtles.

Gallery

See also
 Seacoast defense in the United States

References

External links

 
 Pinellas County listings at National Register of Historic Places
 Florida's Office of Cultural and Historical Programs
 Pinellas County listings
 Fort De Soto Batteries
 FortDeSoto.com - A site dedicated to Fort De Soto Park
 Laboratory for Coastal Research & National Healthy Beaches Campaign, Florida International University
Fort Desoto Trail at 100 Florida Trails

Desoto
Ghost towns in Florida
Parks in Pinellas County, Florida
National Register of Historic Places in Pinellas County, Florida
Florida in the American Civil War
Military and war museums in Florida
Museums in Pinellas County, Florida
Former populated places in Pinellas County, Florida
Beaches of Pinellas County, Florida
Beaches of Florida
1962 establishments in Florida
Protected areas established in 1962